Nordstrand may refer to:

Places
Germany
 Nordstrand, Germany, a peninsula in Germany
 Nordstrand (Amt), a former municipality in Nordfriesland, Germany

Norway
 Nordstrand, Norway, a borough in Oslo, Norway
 Søndre Nordstrand, a borough in Oslo, Norway
 Nordstrand Church, a church in Oslo, Norway
 Nordstrand IF, a sports club in Oslo, Norway
 Nordstrand Station, a railway station in Oslo, Norway
 Nordstrand, Møre og Romsdal, a village in Giske, Norway

People
 Morten Nordstrand, a Danish professional footballer
 Rickard Nordstrand, a Swedish kickboxer

See also
 Nordstrands Blad, a newspaper in Oslo, Norway